Mayar Sherif defeated Maria Sakkari in the final, 7–5, 6–3 to win the women's singles tennis title at the 2022 Emilia-Romagna Open. It was her maiden WTA Tour title, and Sherif became the first Egyptian to win a WTA Tour singles title.

Coco Gauff was the reigning champion, but did not participate.

Seeds

Draw

Finals

Top half

Bottom half

Qualifying

Seeds

Qualifiers

Lucky loser

Qualifying draw

First qualifier

Second qualifier

Third qualifier

Fourth qualifier

Fifth qualifier

Sixth qualifier

References

External links 
 Main draw
 Qualifying draw

2022 WTA Tour
Emilia-Romagna Open